Pyrausta maenialis is a moth in the family Crambidae. It was described by Oberthür in 1894. It is found in China (Tibet).

References

Moths described in 1894
maenialis
Moths of Asia